Kilburn Grange Park is a  open space in Kilburn, north-west London adjacent to Kilburn High Road. It is administered by the London Borough of Camden and includes a children's playground, basketball court, outdoor gym equipment and tennis courts.

The park first opened in 1913 having previously been part of the Grange estate.

External links 
Information from Camden council

Parks and open spaces in the London Borough of Camden
Kilburn, London